Comitas bolognai is a species of sea snail, a marine gastropod mollusc in the family Pseudomelatomidae.

Description
The length of the shell varies between 66 mm and 108 mm.

Distribution
This marine species occurs off Madagascar.

References

 Bozzetti, L. (2001) Tre nuove specie (Mollusca, Gastropoda) dal Madagascar Sud-Occidentale. Malacologia (Monstra Mondiale-Cupra Marittima), 33, 17–19

External links
 Holotype at MNHN, Paris

bolognai
Gastropods described in 2001